Leutnant zur See Wilhelm Thöne was a German World War I flying ace credited with six aerial victories.

Biography
See also Aerial victory standards of World War I

Wilhelm Thöne was a German naval pilot who flew for Marine-Feld Jagdstaffel 1 during the last year of the First World War. On 30 June 1918, he shot down two British Sopwith Camels--one from No. 204 Squadron RAF, the other from No. 213 Squadron RAF. On 31 July, he shot down a third Camel, also from 204 Squadron. However, he also took some bullets to his craft's engine, forcing him down behind German lines. Back in action, he shot down a pair of Camels to become an ace on 12 August 1918. Also in August, he was downed a second time. He swam ashore from the English Channel despite a bullet in his shoulder.

Thöne became an engineer postwar. He would also become a director of German Civil Aviation.

Sources of information

Reference

 Above the Lines: The Aces and Fighter Units of the German Air Service, Naval Air Service and Flanders Marine Corps, 1914–1918. Norman Franks, Frank W. Bailey, Russell Guest. Grub Street, 1993. , .

1893 births
1974 deaths
Military personnel from Hesse
German World War I flying aces